Rachel Miriam Marcia Free Rinast (born 2 June 1991) is a  Swiss footballer who plays as a defender for Grasshopper and the Switzerland national team. She rejoined Köln after spending the 2012–13 season with SC 07 Bad Neuenahr.

Career
Since her debut at the 2015 Algarve Cup, she has been a member of the Swiss national team. She was playing in the German second division for Köln, when Swiss selectors discovered her mother was from St. Gallen and called her up. Rinast is also a singer and in 2014 provided guest vocals on Grau by German rapper DANGA.

References

External links

 
 
 DANGA – "Grau" on YouTube

1991 births
Living people
Swiss women's footballers
German expatriate sportspeople in Israel
SC 07 Bad Neuenahr players
Women's association football defenders
Switzerland women's international footballers
2015 FIFA Women's World Cup players
1. FC Köln (women) players
Bayer 04 Leverkusen (women) players
SC Freiburg (women) players
ASA Tel Aviv University players
Swiss Jews
21st-century Swiss women singers
FC Basel Frauen players
Swiss Women's Super League players
Frauen-Bundesliga players
UEFA Women's Euro 2022 players
UEFA Women's Euro 2017 players
Swiss expatriate women's footballers
Expatriate women's footballers in Israel
Swiss expatriate sportspeople in Israel
German women's footballers
German people of Swiss descent
People from Segeberg
Footballers from Schleswig-Holstein